Carlos Alberto Chavarría Rodriguez (born 2 May 1994) is a Nicaraguan footballer who currently plays for Real Estelí. Chavarría has also represented Nicaragua internationally, both at U-20s, and senior level.

Career
Chavarría was promoted into the senior team of Real Estelí in 2013. To date he has won the Nicaraguan Primera División both seasons with the club. He has also played in the CONCACAF Champions League.

International career
Chavarría made his international debut for Nicaragua in 2013 when he was called up to both the  U-20s, and senior level teams. He made his debut for La Azul y Blanco during the 2013 Copa Centroamericana against Guatemala in a 1–1 draw.

His first goal for the senior team would come during Qualification for the 2018 FIFA World Cup when Chavarría  netted the only goal in the first leg win over Suriname.

International goals
Scores and results list Nicaragua's  goal tally first.

Honours
With Real Estelí F.C.
 Nicaraguan Primera División Champions: 2012–2013, 2013–2014, 2015–2016, 2016–2017.

References

External links

 
 

1994 births
Living people
People from Estelí Department
Nicaraguan men's footballers
Association football forwards
Real Estelí F.C. players
CD Paracuellos Antamira players
Birkirkara F.C. players
Shahr Khodro F.C. players
Club Africain players
Tercera División players
Maltese Premier League players
Persian Gulf Pro League players
Tunisian Ligue Professionnelle 1 players
Nicaragua international footballers
2013 Copa Centroamericana players
2017 CONCACAF Gold Cup players
Nicaraguan expatriate footballers
Nicaraguan expatriate sportspeople in Spain
Expatriate footballers in Spain
Nicaraguan expatriate sportspeople in Malta
Expatriate footballers in Malta
Nicaraguan expatriate sportspeople in Iran
Expatriate footballers in Iran
Expatriate footballers in Tunisia
2019 CONCACAF Gold Cup players